Nicholas James Mowbray (born March 1985) is a New Zealand entrepreneur and businessperson. Together with his brother Mat, he is the co-founder of  toy and consumer products manufacturer ZURU.

Early life
Mowbray grew up in Cambridge, New Zealand, and was educated at St Peter's School. His parents owned a dairy farm. As a teenager, he helped his elder brother Mat to manufacture hot air balloons from Coke cans and plastic bags. After school, he started a law degree but dropped out in his first year.

ZURU
In 2003, when the brothers were 18 and 22, they made a snap decision and moved to Hong Kong to set up a toy factory. With financing from their parents, they purchased an injection moulding machine and started a company in Guangzhou, China. The Mowbrays regard their entrance into the business world as naïve, as they had no experience, could not speak the local language, and had no knowledge of intellectual property legislation. In 2005, the brothers were joined by their sister Anna in their business.

The initial name of their company was Guru and this was changed to ZURU as Guru had been trademarked by another company. According to Mowbray, by the end of 2020 ZURU employed 8500 people, had 26 offices, and a turnover of over $1 billion. Successful toys were Robo Fish (the world's fastest selling toy in 2013) and Bunch O Balloons (the top selling toy in the United States in 2016). In 2018, Mowbray was awarded New Zealand Entrepreneur Of The Year by multinational professional services network Ernst & Young.

Personal
Aged 26, Mowbray developed Crohn's disease. In his early 30s, he moved back to New Zealand to undergo operations after having been told that without treatment, he only had a few years to live.

The siblings bought Coatesville mansion in Coatesville in 2017 for NZ$32.5 million when they were in their early 30s. The mansion is one of New Zealand's most expensive homes and is famous for the January 2012 raid when Kim Dotcom lived there. According to the National Business Review, the net worth of the siblings is NZ$3bn. In late 2020, Mowbray bought a  yacht for NZ$21m.

References

New Zealand businesspeople
Businesspeople in manufacturing
New Zealand billionaires
People educated at St Peter's School, Cambridge
Living people
1985 births